Whispering Hills may refer to:

Canada
Whispering Hills, Alberta, a summer village

United States
Whispering Hills, Dallas, a neighborhood